The Ministry of Rural Affairs of Estonia is a government ministry of Estonia responsible for policies regarding agriculture, food market and food safety, animal health, welfare and breeding, bioeconomy and fishing industry in Estonia. The current Minister of Rural Affairs is Urmas Kruuse.

List of Ministers

References

External links
Official website

Rural Affairs